A poncho is an outer garment for keeping the body warm.

Poncho or PONCHO may also refer to:

 Poncho (video game), an action game developed by Delve Interactive
 PONCHO, a non-profit corporation in Seattle

See also
Pancho